Kothanaloor is a panchayat town in Kanniyakumari district in the Indian state of Tamil Nadu.

Demographics
 India census, Kothanaloor had a population of 15,877. Males constitute 49% of the population and females 51%. Kothanaloor has an average literacy rate of 79%, higher than the national average of 59.5%: male literacy is 82%, and female literacy is 77%. In Kothanaloor, 10% of the population is under 6 years of age.

References

Cities and towns in Kanyakumari district